Pitman may refer to:

 A coal miner, particularly in Northern England
 Pitman (surname)
 Pitman, New Jersey, United States
 Pitman, Pennsylvania, United States
 Pitman, Saskatchewan, Canada
 Pitman Shorthand, a system of shorthand
 Pitman arm, a vehicle steering component
 A connecting rod in an engine
 Pitman (video game), a video game for the Game Boy
 Pitman (publisher), an imprint of Pearson Education, successor to Isaac Pitman and Sons
 Pitman Training Group, a UK training provider originally founded by Isaac Pitman.

See also
 "The Pitman's Courtship", a Geordie folk song
 "The Pitman’s Happy Times", a Geordie folk song
 "The Pitman's Revenge", a Geordie folk song
 Pittman (disambiguation)